Robert Plantagenet Llewellan Camp (February 23, 1868 – October 1, 1948) was a 19th-century Major League Baseball infielder. He played in 1892 for the St. Louis Browns and in 1893 and 1894 for the Chicago Colts. His brother, Kid Camp, was his teammate on the 1894 Colts.

References

Major League Baseball infielders
Chicago Colts players
St. Louis Browns (NL) players
1868 births
1948 deaths
19th-century baseball players
Omaha Omahogs players
Omaha Lambs players
Atlanta Windjammers players
Sioux City Cornhuskers players
St. Paul Apostles players
Grand Rapids Rippers players
Grand Rapids Gold Bugs players
St. Joseph Saints players
Allentown Peanuts players
Paterson Giants players
Baseball players from Columbus, Ohio
Seattle Hustlers players